Thelocactus rinconensis is a species of cactus. It is endemic to Mexico.

Subspecies
 T. r. freudenbergeri
 T. r. hintonii
 T. r. nidulans
 T. r. rinconensis

References

rinconensis
Flora of Mexico
Least concern plants